Robin Osvaldo Betancourth Cué (born 25 November 1991) is a Guatemalan footballer who plays for Liga Nacional club Cobán Imperial and is a member of the Guatemala national football team.

Club career
Born in Petén, Guatemala, Betancourth, who plays as a forward, joined his local side, Heredia Jaguares de Peten as a teenager. He made his professional debut in 2011 at the age of 19.

Betancourth captured the Apertura 2012 scoring title the same day he turned 21 years old, capping off a 13 goal season.

He finished the 2012 Apertura/Clausura with 20 goals in 38 appearances.

International career
Robin Betancourth has represented Guatemala at the U20 and Senior level. He made his national team debut for the senior national team a friendly against Panama on 10 January 2013.

Honours
Cobán Imperial 
Liga Nacional de Guatemala: Apertura 2022

References

1991 births
Living people
Guatemalan footballers
Guatemala international footballers
2013 Copa Centroamericana players
People from Petén Department
Association football forwards
2021 CONCACAF Gold Cup players